The 1989 Ebel U.S. Pro Indoor was a men's tennis tournament played on indoor carpet courts at the Spectrum in Philadelphia, Pennsylvania in the United States that was part of the Super Series of the 1989 Nabisco Grand Prix. It was the 22nd edition of the tournament and was held from February 20 through February 27, 1989. Second-seeded Boris Becker won the singles title.

Finals

Singles

 Boris Becker defeated  Tim Mayotte 7–6, 6–1, 6–3
 It was Becker's 2nd singles title of the year and the 21st of his career.

Doubles

 Paul Annacone /  Christo van Rensburg defeated  Rick Leach /  Jim Pugh 6–3, 7–5
 It was Annacone's 2nd title of the year and the 13th of his career. It was van Rensburg's 2nd title of the year and the 13th of his career.

References

External links
 ITF tournament edition details

Ebel U.S. Pro Indoor
U.S. Pro Indoor
Ebel U.S. Pro Indoor
Ebel U.S. Pro Indoor
Ebel U.S. Pro Indoor
Tennis in Pennsylvania